This is a list of seasons played by Albirex Niigata in Japanese football, from their first competitive to the most recent completed season. It details the club's achievements in major competitions, as well as the club's average attendance and top scorers for each season since 1999. Players in bold were also top scorers in their league that season.

Seasons

Key

References

General
 
 J. League data 

Seasons
 
Albirex Niigata